Stipe Perica (born 7 July 1995) is a Croatian footballer who plays as a striker for Belgian First Division A club Standard Liège.

Club career

Early career
Perica started his playing career in his home-country of Croatia with Zadar in 2012. He made his debut for the first team during the month of September 2012. In his first season, he scored 8 goals in 20 league matches, and 10 goals in all competitions.

Chelsea
On 1 August 2013, Perica signed for Chelsea with a transfer fee of €2.5m. After his arrival at Chelsea, the club loaned Perica out to Dutch club NAC Breda.

Loan to NAC Breda
On his NAC Breda debut he scored his first goal in a 1–5 victory away to Roda JC, having come on as a substitute. A few weeks later he scored the winning goal for 2–1 against Heracles Almelo in his fourth appearance. On 16 February 2014, he was sent-off just 4 minutes after being substituted on in the match against Feyenoord.

In August 2014, his loan deal was extended for the 2014–15 season. However, after the sacking of Breda's manager Nebojša Gudelj, his role was reduced to a bit-part player and he requested a move in search for more game time. On 22 January 2015, his loan with NAC Breda ended and Chelsea loaned him out to Udinese until June 2016.

Udinese
On 8 February 2015 against Napoli, Perica made his debut for Udinese, coming off the bench in the 78th minute for Bruno Fernandes. On 4 April 2015, Perica made his first start for Udinese in a match against Genoa that ended in a 1–1 draw. On 17 May, Perica scored the opener (his first for Udinese) against A.S. Roma, the match ended in a 1–2 loss for Udinese.

On 3 June 2015, Udinese extended Perica's loan deal for one and a half years.
On 20 December 2015, Perica scored his first goal of the 2015–16 Serie A campaign in a 1–0 away victory over Torino, therefore scoring the winning goal in the 41st minute.

On 15 June 2016, Udinese activated a clause in Perica's contract, in which he would join the Italian side on a permanent basis.

Loans to Frosinone, Kasımpaşa and Mouscron
On 18 July 2018, Perica was loaned to newly promoted Serie A club Frosinone for a season. In January, he was recalled from Udinese to join Kasımpaşa after falling down the pecking order.

On 23 August 2019, Perica joined Belgian First Division A club Mouscron on loan until 30 June 2020.

Watford
On 7 September 2020, Perica joined EFL Championship club Watford from Udinese on a 2-year deal for an undisclosed fee.

He made his Watford debut in an EFL Cup tie against Oxford United on 15 September 2020. The game went to a penalty shootout and Perica converted his effort as Watford won. In the following round against Newport County, Perica was sent off for violent conduct as Watford lost 3–1.
He scored his first goal for Watford in a 1–1 draw with Bournemouth on 24 October 2020.

Maccabi Tel Aviv
On 14 August 2021, Perica signed for Israeli side Maccabi Tel Aviv.
On 14 September 2021, Perica scored the first goal of the new UEFA Europa Conference League.

Standard Liège
On 2 September 2022, Perica was acquired by Belgian First Division A club Standard Liège for an undisclosed fee. He made his debut appearance for the club in a 2-0 home win against K.V. Kortrijk, when he came on as a substitute on the 80th minute.

International career
Perica represented Croatia at the FIFA U-20 World Cup in 2013. He was Croatia's youngest player, aged 17, and scored in a 2–1 win over New Zealand on 29 June.

Career statistics

References

External links
 
 Voetbal International profile 

1995 births
Living people
Sportspeople from Zadar
Association football forwards
Croatian footballers
Croatia youth international footballers
Croatia under-21 international footballers
NK Zadar players
Chelsea F.C. players
NAC Breda players
Udinese Calcio players
Frosinone Calcio players
Kasımpaşa S.K. footballers
Royal Excel Mouscron players
Watford F.C. players
Maccabi Tel Aviv F.C. players
Standard Liège players
Croatian Football League players
Eredivisie players
Serie A players
Süper Lig players
Belgian Pro League players
English Football League players
Israeli Premier League players
Croatian expatriate footballers
Expatriate footballers in England
Expatriate footballers in the Netherlands
Expatriate footballers in Italy
Expatriate footballers in Turkey
Expatriate footballers in Belgium
Expatriate footballers in Israel
Croatian expatriate sportspeople in England
Croatian expatriate sportspeople in the Netherlands
Croatian expatriate sportspeople in Italy
Croatian expatriate sportspeople in Turkey
Croatian expatriate sportspeople in Belgium
Croatian expatriate sportspeople in Israel